SS Rijndam may refer to:

, was a transport for the United States Navy during World War I. Both before and after her Navy service she was known as SS Rijndam or Ryndam as an ocean liner for the Holland America Line.
 (Ryndam), was an ocean liner built in 1951; renamed Pride of Mississippi; then Pride of Galveston and sunk in 2003.

Ship names